White Hart Lane is an electoral ward mainly in Tottenham, London Borough of Haringey, London, with some parts located in neighbouring Wood Green and Palmers Green. The ward is represented by three Labour councillors.

The ward covers an area of  1.7 km2, and is located mainly in the N17 and partly in the N22 and N13 postcodes. The ward is named after the road White Hart Lane; the road itself stretches from the junction with Tottenham High Road to the junction with Wood Green High Road, although the ward itself does not cover the entire road.

Demographics
As of 2018, the ward has a population of 14,043; a high proportion of them are from ethnic backgrounds. Those of black ethnicity form the largest ethnic grouping in the ward, representing 28.3% of the population, with white British at 23%. 50.8% of the population identify themselves as Christian and 23.9% Muslims.

The ward is the second-most deprived in Haringey, and one of the most deprived in London. The ward has proportionally the most number of households in social housing in Haringey, and the second highest level of unemployment. It also has a higher level of crime and lower life expectancy compared to Haringey overall.

Local features
There are nine listed buildings in the ward, including Bruce Castle and the War Memorial at Tottenham Cemetery. The football club in the ward is the Haringey Borough F.C. Although also named White Hart Lane, the  White Hart Lane railway station and the former home of Tottenham Hotspur F.C., the White Hart Lane stadium (since replaced by Tottenham Hotspur Stadium), are in the neighbouring ward of Northumberland Park.

Areas around White Hart Lane include:

Upper Edmonton
Northumberland Park, London
Bruce Grove
Wood Green
West Green, London
Palmers Green

Transport 
The area has three stations running close to it. Wood Green tube station runs west of White Hart Lane. Silver Street railway station runs north of the area. White Hart Lane stations is on the borderlines of  Northumberland Park, London and White Hart Lane  neighbourhoods. The Victoria Line also runs close to White Hart Lane, with Seven Sisters station running a mile or so away south of the area.

Buses also run to White Hart Lane station and within the area.

The 149, 259, 349, W3, 279, 217, 444, 144, 318 and the 231 all run close or within White Hart Lane. Shuttlebuses run through White Hart Lane from Alexandra Palace railway station towards White Hart Lane railway station for matches involving Tottenham Hotspur F.C.

References

External links
Ward Profiles Haringey Council

Tottenham
Wards of the London Borough of Haringey